Crazy Life is the debut studio album by Mexican-American Chicano rap recording artist Lil Rob from San Diego, California. It was released on November 18, 1997 through Brown Market Records with distribution by Kingswood Records via Familia Records.

Track listing

Samples
 "Do My Thing" contains a sample from "Doo-Wah-Ditty" by Zapp.
 "Oh, What a Night" contains samples from "Oh, What a Night" performed by The Dells.
 "Jump in the Ride" contains a remade sample of "Hit & Run" by The Bar-Kays.
 "Stop, Look & Listen" contains a sample from "Stop, Look, Listen (To Your Heart)" performed by The Stylistics and a sample from "More Bounce to the Ounce" performed by Zapp.
 "If You Should Lose Me" contains a sample from "You'll Lose a Good Thing" performed by Barbara Lynn.
 "Shells Stackin' Up" contains a sample from "The Payback" performed by James Brown.
 "Brown Crowd" contains samples from "For the Love of You" by The Isley Brothers.
 "Soy Chingon" contains a sample from "Sincerely" by The Moonglows.
 "Pachuco's Night" contains a sample from "Dedicated to the One I Love" by The Shirelles and a sample from "So I Can Love You" by The Emotions.
 "Mexican Gangster" contains a sample from "Cholo" by Johnny Chingas & the Brown Brothers of Soul.
 "Somethin' 2 Relate 2" contains a sample from "If I Was Your Girlfriend" by Prince.

Singles

References

External links

1997 debut albums
Lil Rob albums
G-funk albums